Flora Kazantseva (born 1929) is a Soviet sprinter. She competed in the women's 200 metres at the 1952 Summer Olympics.

References

External links
 

1929 births
Possibly living people
Athletes (track and field) at the 1952 Summer Olympics
Soviet female sprinters
Olympic athletes of the Soviet Union
Place of birth missing (living people)
Olympic female sprinters